is a Japanese professional basketball player.  He currently plays for the San-en NeoPhoenix club of the B.League in Japan.

He represented Japan's national basketball team at the 2016 FIBA Asia Challenge.

He did judo at the elementary school. There was no judo club in his junior high school and switched to basketball. He received entrance offers from 73 high schools and chose the Kashiwa High School in Chiba Prefecture, following the Nakamura's advice.

References

External links
 Asia-basket.com profile
 FIBA profile
 Real GM profile

1984 births
Living people
Centers (basketball)
Japanese men's basketball players
San-en NeoPhoenix players
People from Toyokawa, Aichi
Sportspeople from Aichi Prefecture
Asian Games bronze medalists for Japan
Asian Games medalists in basketball
Basketball players at the 2014 Asian Games
Basketball players at the 2018 Asian Games
Medalists at the 2014 Asian Games